Senator Broxson may refer to:

Doug Broxson (born 1949), Florida State Senate
John R. Broxson (1932–2019), Florida State Senate